Vitamin K epoxide reductase (VKOR) is an enzyme that reduces vitamin K after it has been oxidised in the carboxylation of glutamic acid residues in blood coagulation enzymes. VKOR is a member of a large family of predicted enzymes that are present in vertebrates, Drosophila, plants, bacteria and archaea. In some plant and bacterial homologues, the VKOR domain is fused with domains of the thioredoxin family of oxidoreductases.

Four cysteine residues and one residue, which is either serine or threonine, are identified as likely active-site residues. Solved bacterial VKOR structures has enabled more insights into the catalytic mechanism. All VKORs are transmembrane proteins with at least three TM helices at the catalytic core. The quinone to be reduced is bound by a redox-active CXXC motif in the C-terminal helices, similar to the DsbB active site. Two other cysteines to the N-terminal are located in a loop outside of the transmembrane region; they relay electrons with a redox protein (or in the case of the bacterial homolog, its own fused domain).

The human gene for VKOR is called VKORC1 (VKOR complex subunit 1). It is the target of anticoagulant warfarin. Its partner is a redox protein with an unknown identity.

There is also a similar gene called VKORC1L1. The VKORL1 complex it forms is much less efficient at reducing the epoxide, but it has the ability to reduce the quinone form of vitamin K to a diol form (KH2). Although EC 1.17.4.4 notes both  paralogs as having both activities, the precise division of labor in vitro is debated.

References 

EC 1.17.4